This is a list of Latvian football transfers in the 2020–21 winter transfer window by club. Only transfers of the Latvian Higher League are included.

Latvian Higher League

Riga FC 

In:

Out:

RFS 

In:

Out:

Valmiera 

In:

 

Out:

Ventspils 

In:

Out:

Liepāja 

In:

Out:

Spartaks 

In:

Out:

Jelgava* 

In:

Out:

Daugavpils 

In:

Out:

Metta 

In:

  

Out:

Noah Jurmala** 

In:

Out:

* FK Jelgava failed to obtain the necessary license for participation in the 2021 Latvian Higher League.

** Prior to the change of ownership and relocation of the club, FC Noah Jurmala were known as FC Lokomotiv Daugavpils, promoted to the 2021 Latvian Higher League as winners of the 2020 Latvian First League. FC Noah Jurmala had its license for participation in the 2021 Latvian Higher League revoked on 12 March, 2021 due to outstanding financial liabilities.

References

External links 
 sportacentrs.com 

2020-21
Latvia
Football
tansfers
tansfers